Wesley Kreder (born 4 November 1990) is a Dutch road racing cyclist, who currently rides for UCI WorldTeam .

Career
Kreder achieved his first professional victory in October 2012, making a late-race attack at the Tour de Vendée, and held off the field by two seconds. Kreder remained with the team full-time into the 2013 season.

Kreder joined  for the 2014 season, after his previous team –  – folded at the end of the 2013 season. In September 2014 it was announced that Wesley, Michel and Raymond Kreder would sign with the new  squad for 2015.

Personal life

Major results

2007
 3rd Points race, National Track Championships
2008
 1st Overall Acht van Bladel
 3rd Overall Ronde des Vallées
1st Stage 1b
2009
 10th Arno Wallaard Memorial
2010
 1st Ronde van Midden-Nederland
 2nd Eschborn-Frankfurt City Loop U23
 3rd Kernen Omloop Echt-Susteren
 4th ZLM Tour
 5th Izegem Koers
 9th Memorial Fred De Bruyne
 10th Arno Wallaard Memorial
2011
 1st Stage 2b (TTT) Vuelta Ciclista a León
 3rd Road race, National Under-23 Road Championships
 3rd Overall Tour de Normandie
 3rd Omloop der Kempen
 4th Eschborn-Frankfurt City Loop U23
 5th Grand Prix des Marbriers
 6th Paris–Tours Espoirs
 7th Overall Kreiz Breizh Elites
 9th Ster van Zwolle
 10th Ronde van Noord-Holland
2012
 1st Tour de Vendée
 2nd Zellik–Galmaarden
 3rd Ster van Zwolle
 4th Dorpenomloop Rucphen
 7th Ronde van Noord-Holland
 8th Overall Ronde van Overijssel
2013
 4th Ronde van Drenthe
 5th Kampioenschap van Vlaanderen
 10th Nationale Sluitingsprijs
2014
 3rd Road race, National Road Championships
 3rd Classic Loire Atlantique
 8th Overall World Ports Classic
2015
 9th Dwars door Drenthe
2016
 1st Stage 2 Ster ZLM Toer
2017
 5th Omloop Mandel-Leie-Schelde
2018
 4th Antwerp Port Epic
 5th Ronde van Drenthe
 8th Dwars door het Hageland

Grand Tour general classification results timeline

References

External links

Dutch male cyclists
1990 births
Living people
Sportspeople from Leiden
Cyclists from South Holland
20th-century Dutch people
21st-century Dutch people